Arthur Gorovei (born 19 February 1864, Fălticeni – d. 19 March 1951, Bucharest) was a Romanian writer, folklorist and ethnographer. In 1940, he was elected an honorary member of the Romanian Academy.

Publications

 Cimiliturile românilor.  Bucharest, C. Göbl, 1898.
 Botanica poporului roman. Falticeni, 1915 (in colaborare cu M. Lupescu);
L'Art Roumain. Editura "Institutului International de Cooperare Intelectuala", 1922 (in colaborare cu I. Muslea si Al. Tzigara-Samurcas);
Datorii si drepturi (lucrare premiata de Editura "Cartea Romaneasca", Bucuresti);
Monografia orasului Botosani. 1926;
L'Ornementation des oeufs de Paques chez les Roumains. In "Art populaire", Paris, 1930;
Notiuni de folclor. Editura "Cartea Romaneasca", Bucuresti, 1933;
Dr. Ioan Urban-Iarnik. In "Cunoştinte folositoare", Nr. 69, Seria C. Editura "Cartea Romaneasca", București;
Ouăle de Paşti – Tipografia "Monitorul Oficial", Bucuresti, 1937;
Nicu Gane – In "Cunostinte folositoare", Nr. 65, Seria C. Editura "Cartea Romaneasca", Bucuresti, 1937;
Moş Gheorghe (novella);
Moşneagul (novella);
Ionică al lui Ion (short story);
Ţiganul (short story) -. In "Cuget Clar", Nr. 29, 27 Ianuarie 1938;
Sbuciumul unui suflet nou (novel). Editura "Cartea Romaneasca", Bucuresti, 1939;
Vopsitul prin buruieni. In "Cunostinte folositoare". Editura "Cartea Romaneasca", Bucuresti, 1939;
''O farsă a lui Vlahuţă, Buldogele Venetiei" (f.a.d.).

References

1864 births
1951 deaths
Honorary members of the Romanian Academy
Romanian folklorists
Romanian ethnographers
Members of the Iron Guard